Milana may refer to:
 , a Slavic feminine name
 Milana (film), a 2007 Indian Kannada-language romantic drama film

See also 
 Milan (disambiguation)